Bhanwta is a village in Ajmer tehsil of Ajmer district of Rajasthan state in India. The village falls under Bhanwta gram panchayat.

Demography 
As per 2011 census of India, Bhanwta has population of 4,323 of which 2,202 are males and 2,121 are females. Sex ratio of the village is 963.

Transportation
Bhanwta is connected by air (Kishangarh Airport), by train (Ajmer Junction railway station) and by road.

See also
Ajmer Tehsil

References

Villages in Ajmer district